Arsys Software (アルシスソフトウェア), later known as Cyberhead (サイバーヘッド), was a Japanese video game software development company active from 1985 to 2001.

Overview
The company was founded as Arsys Software by former Technosoft staff members Osamu Nagano and Kotori Yoshimura on 11 November 1985. They were primarily involved in PC game development, having previously created the original Thunder Force (a 1983 free-scrolling shooter game) and Plazma Line (a 1984 space racing game considered the first computer game with 3D polygon graphics) at Technosoft. In 1986, Arsys debuted with the 3D role-playing shooter Wibarm, followed by the free-roaming adventure game Reviver: The Real-Time Adventure in 1987 and the 3D first-person shooter role-playing game Star Cruiser in 1988. When Star Cruiser was released in 1988, the company only had two employees, which grew to a dozen employees by 1991, when development began on Star Cruiser 2; by 2001, the company had reduced to three employees.

In addition to its own products, they also ported games to Japanese computer platforms, such as Prince of Persia and several SystemSoft games. Their Prince of Persia port for the NEC PC-98 featured enhanced visuals, introducing the Prince's classic turban and vest look, and became the basis for later Prince of Persia ports and games by Riverhillsoft and Broderbund. They also contributed to the development of several games from other companies, such as the Namco's 1995 combat flight simulator Air Combat and Sony Computer Entertainment's 1997 racing simulator Gran Turismo both for the PlayStation. They also released the chiptune video game music soundtrack album Arsys Best Selection (アルシス・ベストセレクション) in 1990.  The company eventually closed down in 2001.

Notable releases

Wibarm

Wibarm (1986), stylized as WiBArM (ウィバーン), is an early role-playing shooter released by Arsys Software for the NEC PC-88 computer in Japan and ported to MS-DOS for Western release by Broderbund. It combines run and gun shooter gameplay with role-playing video game elements, and was also the first action role-playing game to feature 3D polygonal graphics. In Wibarm, the player controls a transformable mecha robot that can shift between walking mode, a tank, and a flying jet. The viewpoint switches between several different perspectives: a 2D top-down perspective while flying, a side-scrolling view during on-foot outdoor exploration, a fully 3D polygonal third-person perspective inside buildings, and arena-style 2D shoot 'em up battles during boss encounters.

The game features a variety of weapons and equipment as well as an automap, and the player can upgrade equipment and earn experience to raise stats. In contrast to first-person RPGs at the time that were restricted to 90-degree movements, Wibarm's use of 3D polygons allows full 360-degree movement. It won the 1986 Game of the Year award from the Japanese computer game magazine Oh!MZ, later known as Oh!X.

Reviver
Reviver: The Real-Time Adventure, also known as Reviver (リバイバ), is an adventure game designed by Kotori Yoshimura and released by Arsys Software in July 1987, for the NEC PC-88, FM-7, Sharp X1, Sharp MZ and MSX2 platforms. The sub-title, The Real-Time Adventure, is a reference to the game's early use of a real-time persistent world, where time continues to elapse, day-night cycles adjust the brightness of the screen to indicate the time of day, and certain stores and non-player characters would only be available at certain times of the day. The game also gives players direct control over the player character. The game also features a fantasy story, full-colour 2D overhead scrolling graphics, and role-playing video game elements. It won the 1987 Game of the Year award from Japanese gaming magazine Oh!X.

Star Cruiser

Star Cruiser (スタークルーザー) was a first-person role-playing shooter released for the PC-88 in 1988. The game is considered innovative and ahead of its time, for being an early example of an action role-playing game with fully 3D polygonal graphics, combined with early first-person shooter gameplay, which would occasionally switch to space flight simulator gameplay when exploring the open-ended outer space with six degrees of freedom. All the backgrounds, objects and opponents in the game were rendered in 3D polygons, many years before they were widely adopted by the video game industry. The game also emphasized storytelling, with plot twists and extensive character dialogues, taking place in a futuristic science fiction setting.

It won the 1988 Game of the Year awards from the Japanese computer game magazines POPCOM and Oh!X. The game was later ported to the Sharp X68000 computer platform in 1989, and the Sega Mega Drive (Genesis) video game console in 1990. The game's sequel, Star Cruiser 2, was released in 1992, for the PC-9821 and FM Towns computers. Seven chiptune video game music soundtrack albums of both Star Cruiser games, composed by Toshiya Yamanaka, have been released from 1992 to 2008.

Air Combat and Gran Turismo

The company contributed to the development of several games from other companies. These include Namco's 1995 combat flight simulator Air Combat and Sony Computer Entertainment's 1997 racing simulator Gran Turismo both for the PlayStation.

List of video games
The following games were developed by the company:

References

External links

 (Translated)

Defunct video game companies of Japan
Video game development companies
Video game companies established in 1985
Video game companies disestablished in 2001
Japanese companies established in 1985
Japanese companies disestablished in 2001